Arthur Beckwith may refer to:

Arthur Beckwith (d. 1700) of the Beckwith baronets
Arthur Beckwith (violinist) of the Philharmonic Quartet

See also
Beckwith (surname)